The Drielaker See is a coastal lake in Osternburg subdistrict of Drielake in the municipal area of Oldenburg, Niedersachsen.

Description 

The 10.4 ha lake was created during the construction of the Autobahn A 29 in the 1980s. The reason for this evacuation was for the construction of the ramps for the 26 meter high motorway viaduct. Today it is used a recreational area with close proximity to the port an commercial areas.

The Drielaker See is used by the Sport Fishing Club of Oldenburg (Sportfischer-Verein Oldenburg e.V.) for angling. The Hemmelsbäker Canal runs directly from the northeastern side of the lake, which leads into the Hunte about 100 meters further north.

References
 "Drielaker See Bei 26135 Oldenburg." Badeseen in Niedersachsen. Antenne Niedersachsen, n.d. Web. 17 Feb. 2016. <https://web.archive.org/web/20160224061909/http://www.antenne.com/service/badeseen/drielaker-see/>.

External links

 www.anglermap.de: Gewässersteckbrief Drielaker See, Last accessed on November 5, 2014.

Lakes of Lower Saxony